This is a list of members of the Australian Senate from 1974 to 1975. The 18 May 1974 election was a double dissolution of both Houses, with all 127 seats in the House of Representatives, and all 60 seats in the Senate up for election.  The incumbent Labor Party led by Prime Minister Gough Whitlam defeated the opposition Liberal Party led by Billy Snedden and their Coalition partner the Country Party led by Doug Anthony.

In accordance with section 13 of the Constitution, following a double dissolution of Parliament, the terms for senators commence on 1 July preceding the election – i.e., on 1 July 1973.  The first five senators elected in each state were allocated the full six-year terms ending on 30 June 1979 while the other half were allocated three-year terms ending on 30 June 1976. However, in fact, the Senate was dissolved on 11 November 1975 for another double dissolution election on 13 December 1975.

The process for filling casual vacancies was complex. While senators were elected for a six-year term, people appointed to a casual vacancy only held office until the earlier of the next election for the House of Representatives or the Senate. It was an established convention that the state parliament choose (or the governor appoint) a replacement from the same political party as their predecessor, however this convention was not always followed. There were two appointments to casual vacancies in this term however neither followed the convention with Labor Senator Lionel Murphy being replaced by Independent Cleaver Bunton and Labor Senator Bertie Milliner being replaced by Albert Field who was expelled as a member of the Labor party for accepting the appointment instead of Labor nomination Mal Colston.

At the May 1974 election, Labor won 29 seats, the Coalition won 29 seats and the balance of power was shared by Liberal Movement Senator Steele Hall and Independent Michael Townley. The President of the Senate votes and if the votes are equal, the motion is defeated. Thus the Labor government needed the support of both cross-bench senators to pass any legislation. The Coalition was increased to 30 seats when Townley joined the Liberal party in February 1975 and thus could effectively block any government legislation or motions, but could not pass any motion on their own. Labor was reduced to 27 seats by the replacement of 2 Labor senators with independents. Field was sworn in on 9 September 1975, however he was given leave from 1 October, not to attend the Senate pending a High Court challenge to his eligibility. As a result, the Coalition had a majority in the Senate and as well as blocking supply, could also pass a motion to defer Supply until an election was called. Thus the casual appointments process contributed to the 1975 Australian constitutional crisis.

The controversial appointments of Senators Bunton and Field prompted the 1977 referendum to amend the Constitution to require a replacement senator to be a member of the same political party.

Notes

References

 

Members of Australian parliaments by term
20th-century Australian politicians
Australian Senate lists